Joseph Cruikshank Talbot (September 5, 1816 – January 15, 1883) was the missionary bishop of the Northwest and the third bishop of the Episcopal Diocese of Indiana.

Early life
Joseph Talbot was born to Quaker parents in Alexandria, Virginia, in 1816, where he attended the Pierpont Academy in his childhood.  In 1835 he moved to Louisville, Kentucky, and was baptized in Christ Church there in 1837 and soon confirmed in the Episcopal Church.  On February 23, 1838, he married Anna Matilda Wares, daughter of Samuel Waris, a captain of the United States Army.

Early ministry
Talbot studied for ordination under Benjamin B. Smith and became a candidate for holy orders in 1843.  He was ordained deacon on September 5, 1846, and priest on September 6, 1848, both by Smith.  While in deacon's orders he organized a third church in Louisville, St. John's Church, and became the rector there upon his ordination to the priesthood.  In January, 1853 he moved to Indianapolis, Indiana, and became the rector of Christ Church where he served seven years.  He received the degree of D.D. from the Western University of Pennsylvania in 1854.  In 1867 while at the Lambeth Conference, he was conferred with the degree of LL.D. by the University of Cambridge.

Bishop of the Northwest
Talbot was elected by the House of Bishops as Missionary Bishop of the Northwest (or North-West) in 1859 and consecrated on February 15, 1860, by Jackson Kemper, assisted by Benjamin B. Smith, Cicero S. Hawks, George Upfold, and Gregory T. Bedell.  The Missionary District of the Northwest included New Mexico, Dakota, Wyoming, Colorado, Arizona, Utah, Montana, and Idaho, covering nearly nine hundred thousand square miles.  Talbot referred to himself as “Bishop of All Outdoors.”  He served in this position for five years.

Bishop of Indiana
On August 23, 1865, Talbot was elected Assistant Bishop of Indiana, where he began his duties that October.  Due to diocesan bishop George Upfold’s feeble health, he acted as the virtual executive head of the diocese until Upfold's death in 1872.  He took over as diocesan bishop on August 26, 1872.  He served in this capacity until his death in 1883.

Notes

References
 Armentrout, Don S. & Robert Boak Slocum (2000). An Episcopal Dictionary of the Church: A User-Friendly Reference for Episcopalians. New York: Church Publishing Incorporated. Retrieved 2013-02-11.
 Batterson, Hermon Griswold (1891). A Sketch-book of the American Episcopate Philadelphia: J. B. Lippencott & Co. Retrieved 2013-02-11.
 Bishop Joseph C. Talbott obituary in the New York Times, January 16, 1883. Retrieved 2013-02-11.
 Bishops of the Diocese of the Rio Grande at The Institute of Historical Survey Foundation. Retrieved 2013-02-11.

1816 births
1883 deaths
People from Alexandria, Virginia
University of Pittsburgh alumni
Alumni of the University of Cambridge
American bishops
Talbot
19th-century American Episcopalians
Episcopal bishops of Arizona
Episcopal bishops of Nevada
19th-century American clergy